Roberto Brito (born 7 August 1947) is a Mexican former cyclist. He competed in the team time trial at the 1968 Summer Olympics.

References

External links
 

1947 births
Living people
Mexican male cyclists
Olympic cyclists of Mexico
Cyclists at the 1968 Summer Olympics
Sportspeople from Mexico City
Pan American Games medalists in cycling
Pan American Games silver medalists for Mexico
Cyclists at the 1967 Pan American Games